William Adolphus Crouse (October 22, 1866, Fannettsburg, Pennsylvania – June 27, 1941) was an American Medal of Honor recipient.

Biography
He was awarded the Medal of Honor for his bravery off Cavite, Manila Bay, Philippines, May 21, 1898. He was awarded his Medal on December 14, 1898.

He rose the rank of Chief Commissary Steward before retiring from the Navy.

Crouse died in 1941 and is buried in Arlington Cemetery in Drexel Hill, Pennsylvania.

Medal of Honor citation
Following the blowout of a lower manhole plate joint on boiler B of that vessel, Crouse hauled the fires in the hot, vapor-filled atmosphere which necessitated the playing of water into the fireroom from a hose.

See also

 List of Medal of Honor recipients

External links
 

United States Navy Medal of Honor recipients
People from Franklin County, Pennsylvania
American military personnel of the Spanish–American War
American military personnel of the Philippine–American War
1866 births
1941 deaths
Burials at Arlington Cemetery (Pennsylvania)
Spanish–American War recipients of the Medal of Honor